USS Standard Arrow (ID-1532) was a United States Navy tanker in commission from 1917 to 1919. She was built as SS Standard Arrow for the Standard Oil Company. In World War II, she was again acquired by the U.S. Navy from Standard Oil and commissioned as USS Signal (IX-142) a station tanker in the Pacific from 1944 to 1946.

Construction, acquisition, and commissioning
SS Standard Arrow was built as a commercial tanker in 1916 at Camden, New Jersey, by the New York Shipbuilding Company for the Standard Transportation Company of New York City. The U.S. Navy acquired Standard Arrow from Standard Transportation under a bareboat charter on 22 August 1917 for use during World War I. She was assigned the Naval Registry Identification Number (Id. No.) 1532 and commissioned as USS Standard Arrow the same day at Mare Island Navy Yard in Vallejo, California.

United States Navy service as USS Standard Arrow, 1917-1919
Standard Arrow was on a voyage from Devonport, England, to New York City when the Naval Overseas Transportation Service was established on 9 January 1918 and she was assigned to it. She arrived at New York on 19 January 1918 and was refitted for Navy duty. She then loaded a cargo of fuel oil and departed New York for Devonport on 4 February 1918. However, she collided with the tanker  that day, damaged her steering gear, and sprang a leak in her forward hold. She returned to port, discharged her cargo to tanker USS Maumee (AO-2), and was drydocked until 25 February 1918. Standard Arrow then replenished her cargo and sailed with a convoy for England, arriving at Portsmouth on 16 March 1918. Between that day and 17 December 1918, she made five additional trips to Europe.

Upon her arrival at New York City on 17 December 1918, Standard Arrow was scheduled for demobilization. She was decommissioned on 29 January 1919 and transferred to the United States Shipping Board.

United States Navy service as USS Signal, 1944-1946
The U.S. Navy again acquired Standard Arrow on 4 April 1944 for World War II service and commissioned her as the miscellaneous auxiliary USS Signal (IX-142) the same day.

Signal operated in the Pacific Ocean for the remainder of World War II, carrying and storing oil for Service Squadron 10, based at Majuro Atoll and Ulithi Atoll, and serving as station tanker at those atolls.

In February 1946, the Navy transferred Signal to the Maritime Commission, which placed her in its reserve fleet at Mobile, Alabama. She was returned to her owner on 20 February 1946 and her name was stricken from the Navy List on 12 March 1946.

Later career
Once again named SS Standard Arrow, the ship resumed commercial operations for about a year. She was scrapped in April 1947.

Notes

References

NavSource Online: Section Patrol Craft Photo Archive: Signal (IX 142) ex-Standard Arrow (ID 1532)

Tankers of the United States
Ships built by New York Shipbuilding Corporation
1916 ships
Unique oilers and tankers of the United States Navy
World War I tankers of the United States
World War I auxiliary ships of the United States